Nadezhda Kotlyarova (born 12 June 1989) is a Russian sprinter. She competed in the 400 metres event at the 2015 World Championships in Athletics in Beijing, China. In 2016, she tested positive for meldonium.

References

External links

1989 births
Living people
Russian female sprinters
World Athletics Championships athletes for Russia
Place of birth missing (living people)
Universiade medalists in athletics (track and field)
Universiade gold medalists for Russia
Medalists at the 2013 Summer Universiade